The discography of American girl group School Gyrls (briefly known as Forever) consists of two studio albums, 5 singles (including 1 as a featured artist), and 4 music videos.

Albums

Studio albums

Singles

As lead artist

As featured artist

Unreleased songs

Music videos

References

Discographies of American artists